A mode may refer to:

 A mode (photography), aperture priority mode in electronically controlled cameras
 PDF/A mode, an (archival) variant of the PDF file format
 Mode A, a transponder mode in aviation
 A-Mode of ultrasound imaging and therapeutic ultrasound